John Rollins may refer to:

John Rollins (golfer) (born 1975), American golfer
John W. Rollins (1916–2000), American businessman and politician
John Rollins (Minnesota politician) (1806–1883), American politician
John C. Rollins, state legislator in Arkansas

See also
Jack Rollins (disambiguation)